Meigu County is a part of the Liangshan Yi Autonomous Prefecture in the south of Sichuan province. Located in the northeast of Liangshan Prefecture, it has a major concentration of the Nuosu or Yi people.  The county is largely mountainous.  It is a poor area and 

Many bimo (shaman) live in this county, and it is home to the Cultural Centre for Bimo Studies.

 Postal code for Meigu County: 616450

Size and population
 Area: 2,574 sq. kilometers
 Percentage of cultivated land: 4.98%
 Per capita cultivated land: 733 sq. meters
 Population: 178,642
 Number of Households: 44,702
 Percentage of Yi among the population: 97.6%

Economic data, 2002
 GDP: 204,940,000 RMB
Gross annual output value from:
 Agriculture: 88,670,000 RMB
 Forestry: 17,330,000 RMB
 Animal husbandry:  98,670,000 RMB
 Other: 270,000 RMB
Net annual income averaged per farmer: 917 RMB

Points of interest
 Dafengding Nature Reserve (panda and bird habitat)

Climate

References

External links
 Land Occupation and Resettlement Plan
 Prefectural page on Meigu County (in Chinese)

County-level divisions of Sichuan
Yi people
Liangshan Yi Autonomous Prefecture